Kiss & Love is a 2014 two-CD charity album by various French-language artists in favour of Sidaction, a major French public event that started in 1994 in France for raising awareness and collecting charitable funds for AIDS. It donates important sums to various AIDS charities, HIV/AIDS research, institutions specializing in medical care and social aid for those suffering of HIV/AIDS in France and internationally.

The collective title track "Kiss & Love" became the main single from the album.

Participants
Besides the collective "Kiss & Love", the album contains 20 tracks, sung by 42 artists. 19 tracks are  duets, whereas one track ("L'envie d'aimer") is performed by four artists.

Track listing
CD 1:

CD 2:

Charts

Weekly charts

Year-end charts

Charting tracks from album

*Did not appear in the official Belgian Ultratop 50 charts, but rather in the bubbling under Ultratip charts

References

2014 compilation albums
Warner Music France compilation albums